Collyridianism (or Kollyridianism) was a Early Christian heretical movement in Arabia whose adherents apparently worshipped the Virgin Mary, mother of Jesus as a goddess. The existence of the sect is subject to some dispute by scholars, as the only contemporary source to describe it is the Panarion of Epiphanius of Salamis, published in approximately 376 AD. 

According to Epiphanius, certain women in largely-pagan Arabia syncretised indigenous beliefs with the worship of Mary and offered little cakes or bread-rolls. The cakes were called collyris (Greek: κολλυρις) and are the source of the name Collyridians. Epiphanius stated that Collyridianism originated in Thrace and Scythia although it may have first travelled to those regions from Syria or Asia Minor.

Interpretations
The adoption of the mother of Jesus as a virtual goddess may represent a reintroduction of aspects of the worship of Isis. According to Sabrina Higgins, "When looking at images of the Egyptian goddess Isis and those of the Virgin Mary, one may initially observe iconographic similarities. These parallels have led many scholars to suggest that there is a distinct iconographic relationship between Isis and Mary. In fact, some scholars have gone even further, and have suggested, on the basis of this relationship, a direct link between the cult of Mary and that of Isis." Conversely, Carl Olson and Sandra Miesel dispute the idea that Christianity copied elements of Isis's iconography, saying that the symbol of a mother and her child is part of the universal human experience.

The theologian Karl Gerok disputed the existence of the Collyridians, describing it as improbable that a sect composed only of women could have lasted for as long as described by Epiphanius. The Protestant writer Samuel Zwemer pointed out that the only source of information about the sect came from Epiphanius.

In his 1976 book The Virgin, the historian Geoffrey Ashe put forward the hypothesis that the Collyridians represented a parallel Marian religion to Christianity, founded by first-generation followers of the Virgin Mary, whose doctrines were later subsumed by the Church at the Council of Ephesus in 431. The historian Averil Cameron has been more skeptical about whether the movement even existed and noted that Epiphanius is the only source for the group and that later authors simply refer to his text.

In Christian–Muslim dialogue

The Collyridians have become of interest in Christian–Muslim religious discussions in reference to the Islamic concept of the Christian Trinity. That idea has never been part of mainstream Christian doctrine and is not clearly and unambiguously attested among any ancient Christian group, including the Collyridians.

However, research in Islamic studies claims that "the quranic accusations that christians claim Mary as God can be understood as a rhetorical statement." For example, David Thomas states that verse 5:116 need not be seen as describing actually professed beliefs but rather as giving examples of shirk (claiming divinity for beings other than God) and a "warning against excessive devotion to Jesus and extravagant veneration of Mary, a reminder linked to the central theme of the Qur'an that there is only one God and He alone is to be worshipped." When read in that light, it can be understood as an admonition: "Against the divinization of Jesus that is given elsewhere in the Qur'an and a warning against the virtual divinization of Mary in the declaration of the fifth-century church councils that she is 'God-bearer'". Similarly, Gabriel Reynolds, Sidney Griffith and Mun'im Sirry argue that the verse is to be understood as a rhetoric statement to warn from the dangers of deifying Jesus or Mary.

References

Mary, mother of Jesus
Christian denominations established in the 4th century
Heresy in ancient Christianity